Gerhard Reinke's Wanderlust is a mockumentary television comedy that was originally broadcast on the American basic cable channel Comedy Central on March 8, 2003. It stars writer-comedian Josh Gardner as Gerhard Reinke, a German backpacker with an idiosyncratic style, as he travels around the world on a small budget.

List of episodes

Characters

Pepe Lucho is a minor secondary character featured in the Comedy Central show Gerhard Reinke's Wanderlust.

Gerhard Reinke is initially smitten with Lucho; however, slightly after the revelation of his name, Pepe Lucho begins attacking Gerhard and Amazonian villagers alike.

Through its cinematography, it is made to seem as if the diminutive New World monkey is a savage beast.  Everyone runs in terror and several shots are fired in a vain attempt to stop the killing.  However, several times throughout the episode, Pepe Lucho manages to catch up again to the protagonist.

At the end of the show, a memorial is shown: Pepe Lucho (1997–2002) "Keep chasing rainbows".

References

External links
 
 Comedy Central Press Central – Press Release, Bio and Photos
 Josh Gardner's YouTube Channel
 Tom Stern on Vimeo

2003 American television series debuts
2003 American television series endings
Comedy Central original programming
2000s American mockumentary television series
Television series about television